In combinatorics, the Cameron–Erdős conjecture (now a theorem) is the statement that the number of sum-free sets contained in  is 

The sum of two odd numbers is even, so a set of odd numbers is always sum-free. There are  odd numbers in [N&hairsp;], and so  subsets of odd numbers in [N&hairsp;]. The Cameron–Erdős conjecture says that this counts a constant proportion of the sum-free sets.

The conjecture was stated by Peter Cameron and Paul Erdős in 1988.  It was proved by Ben Green and independently by Alexander Sapozhenko in 2003.

See also
 Erdős conjecture

Notes

Additive number theory
Combinatorics
Theorems in discrete mathematics
Paul Erdős
Conjectures that have been proved